Krasnoye is a rural locality (a selo) and the administrative center of Krasnyanskoye Rural Settlement, Novokhopyorsky District, Voronezh Oblast, Russia. The population was 2,490 as of 2010. There are 16 streets.

Geography 
Krasnoye is located 15 km northwest of Novokhopyorsk (the district's administrative centre) by road. Nekrylovo is the nearest rural locality.

References 

Populated places in Novokhopyorsky District